The Uṣṇīṣa Vijaya Dhāraṇī Sūtra (Sanskrit: उष्णीष विजय धारणी सूत्र; IAST: uṣṇīṣa vijaya dhāraṇī sūtra, Chinese: 佛頂尊勝陀羅尼經; Pinyin: Fódǐng Zūnshèng Tuóluóní Jīng; Rōmaji: Butsuchō Sonshō Darani Kyō; Vietnamese: Phật Đảnh Tôn Thắng Đà La Ni; English: Dhāraṇī of the Victorious Buddha-Crown/The Sūtra of The Supreme Sacrosanct Dhāraṇī From The Buddha's Summit)  is a Mahāyāna Sūtra from India. An alternate longer Sanskrit title is the Sarvadurgatipariśodhana Uṣṇīṣa Vijaya Dhāraṇī Sūtra (सर्वदुर्गतिपरिशोधन उष्णीष विजय धारणी सूत्र).

History
The sutra was translated a total of eight times from Sanskrit to Chinese between 679 and 988 CE. It gained wide circulation in China, and its practices have been utilized since the Tang dynasty, from which it then spread to the rest of East Asia. The Uṣṇīṣa Vijaya dhāraṇī is associated with Mount Wutai, which in the Chinese Buddhist tradition is considered the bodhimaṇḍa of Mañjuśrī. Sacred stone tablets with the Uṣṇīṣa Vijaya dhāraṇī carved into them have been distributed widely in some regions of the Far East.

Contents
The purpose of this sūtra is said to be to help sentient beings in a troubled and tumultuous world. According to this sūtra, beings will leave suffering and obtain happiness, increasing in their prosperity and longevity, remove karmic obstacles, eliminate disasters and calamities, remove enmity and hatred, fulfill all wishes, and quickly be led onto the Buddha's way. It is held by some that when the dhāraṇī is heard, it can imbue the alaya consciousness with pure seeds that will help to lead one to buddhahood. This mantra is also linked to Green Tara.

According to the text, major applications of this dhāraṇī include:
 Destroy calamities and rescue those in difficulties
 Eliminate offenses and create good deeds
 Purify all karmic obstructions
 Increase blessings and lengthen lifespan
 Attain anuttarā-samyak-saṃbodhi
 Relieve beings in the ghost realm
 Benefit birds, animals and all crawling creatures
 Increase wisdom
 Revert the fixed karma;
 Eliminate various illness;
 Destroy hells;
 Ensure the safety of the households, and having children to inherit the family pride;
 Harmonise husbands and wives;
 Be able to reborn in Sukhavati or other pure lands;
 Heal sickness inflicted by pretas;
 Request for rain etc.

Some quotes from the sutra text include:

Sūtra
According to the Sūtra a devaputra by the name of Susthita was enjoying the supremely wonderful bliss of heavenly life. But then he suddenly heard a voice in space saying,

On hearing this, Devaputra Susthita was so terrified and rushed over to the Heavenly Palace of Lord Śakra. Bursting into tears, he prostrated himself and telling what had happened to Lord Śakra. Lord Śakra immediately calmed his mind to enter Samādhi. Instantly, he saw that Susthita would undergo seven successive evil paths in the forms of a pig, dog, jackal, monkey, python, crow and vulture, all feeding on filth and putrescence. Lord Śakra could not think of any way to help Susthita. He felt that only the Tathāgata, Arhat, Samyaksambuddha could save Susthita from falling into the great sufferings of evil destinies.

Soon after nightfall, Lord Śakra made preparation and head to the garden of Anāthapiṇḍada. Upon arrival, Lord Śakra prostrated himself at the Buddha's, then circumambulated the Buddha seven times clockwise in worship, before laying out this great Pūjā (offerings/obeisances). Kneeling in front of the Buddha, Lord Śakra described the future destiny of Devaputra Susthita.

Instantly, the uṣṇīṣa (crown of the head) of the Tathāgata radiated multiple rays of light, illuminating the world in all ten directions—the light then returned. The Buddha smiled and said to Lord Śakra, “Lord of Heaven, there is a Dhāraṇī known as the Uṣṇīṣa Vijaya Dhāraṇī. It can purify all evil paths, completely eliminating all sufferings of beings in the realms of hell, King Yama and animal, destroy all the hells, and transfer sentient beings onto the virtuous path.” After hearing all the disclosure, Lord of Heaven appealed to the Buddha to discourse of this great Dhāraṇī. The Buddha aware of Lord Śakra's intention and his eagerness to hear His discourse of this Dhāraṇī and so immediately proclaimed the Mantra. Then the Buddha told Lord Śakra, “The Mantra is known as the ‘Purifying All Evil Path’ Uṣṇīṣa Vijaya Dhāraṇī’. It can eliminate all evil kārmic hindrances and eradicate the suffering of all evil paths.” Again the Buddha told Lord Śakra that this great Dhāraṇī is proclaimed together by Buddhas as numerous as eighty-eight koṭis (hundred million) of the grains of sand of the Ganges River. All Buddhas rejoice and uphold this Dhāraṇī that is verified by the wisdom seal of the Vairocana Tathāgata.

Again the Buddha reminded Lord Śakra should, in turn, transmit it to Devaputra Susthita and in addition, you yourself should receive and uphold it, recite, contemplate and treasure it, memorize and preserve it. This Dhāraṇī should be widely proclaimed to all beings in the Jambudvīpa world and entrust him for the benefit of all heavenly beings. The Buddha also reminded Lord Śakra should diligently uphold and protect it, never letting it be forgotten or lost.

After the Lord Śakra received this Dhāraṇī practice from the Buddha, he returned to his heavenly palace to convey it to Devaputra  Susthita. Having received this Dhāraṇī, Devaputra Susthita kept practices as instructed for six days and six nights, after which all his wishes were completely fulfilled.

When seven days were over, Lord Śakra brought Devaputra Susthita, together with other heavenly beings, respectfully approached the Buddha and presented their grand offerings. Once they have respectfully circumambulated a hundred thousand times, paid homage to the Buddha, then happily took their seats and listened to the Buddha preach the Dharma.

The World Honoured One then extended his golden arm and touched Devaputra Susthita to bestow a prediction of Devaputra Susthita's attainment to Bodhi.

Mantra
In the Sanskrit language:

Another Sanskrit version is:

This Uṣṇīṣa Vijaya Dhāraṇī includes several additions to the original Sanskrit transliteration, for completeness, and in light of other versions.

In addition to the long dhāraṇī, there is the much shorter Uṣṇīṣa Vijaya heart-mantra:

Translation
D.T. Suzuki translated the Uṣṇīṣa Vijaya Dhāraṇī into the English language and this was included in the Manual of Zen Buddhism.

Ten doors
According to the Records of the Teaching of Uṣṇīṣa Vijaya Dhāraṇī Sūtra by Great Dharma Master Fa Cong (in the Tang dynasty), the great and unsurpassed merits of this Dharani can be categorised into ten doors as follows:
 The door of taking refuge under the sages.
 The door of revealing the Dharma Body.
 The door of purifying evil paths.
 The door of good and brightness initiation.
 The door of spiritual power protection.
 The door of lengthening the lifespan.
 The door of integrating concentration and wisdom.
 The door of Vajra offering.
 The door of universally attaining purity.
 The door of accomplishing Nirvana.

See also
Dharani pillar

Further reading
 F. Max Müller, Bunyiu Nanjio (1884). The ancient palm-leaves: containing the Pragna-paramita-hridaya-sutra and the Ushnisha-vigaya-dharani. Sanskrit and Japanese texts, edited and translated, with an appendix by G. Bühler, Anecdota Oxoniensia, Aryan series, III. Oxford: Clarendon Press. Reprint 1972
 Uṣṇīṣa Vijaya Dhāraṇī Sutra Chinese/English/Malay Translation by Malaysia Usnisa Vijaya Buddhist Association (Malay: Persatuan Penganut Agama Buddha Usnisa Vijaya Malaysia)
 Chandra, Lokesh (1980). Iconography of the Goddess Uṣṇīṣa Vijaya, Acta Orientalia Academiae Scientiarum Hungaricae 34 (1/3), 125-137
 Usnisa Vijaya Dharani Sutra（Chinese/English/Malay）

References

6. ^ Usnisa Vijaya Dharani Sutra（Chinese/English/Malay）
https://sites.google.com/view/usnisavijaya

External links

 The Noble Uṣṇīṣavijayā Dhāraṇī That Purifies All Lower Rebirths - Translation at 84,000
 Uṣṇīṣa Vijaya Dhāraṇī Sūtra
 Recording of the Usnisa Vijaya Dharani

Mahayana sutras